Metarctia negusi is a moth of the subfamily Arctiinae. It was described by Sergius G. Kiriakoff in 1957. It is found in Ethiopia.

References

 

Endemic fauna of Ethiopia
Metarctia
Moths described in 1957